Gary City Center Historic District is a national historic district located at Gary, Indiana.  The district encompasses 60 contributing buildings and 2 contributing sites in Downtown Gary. It developed between about 1906 and 1944 includes notable examples of Tudor Revival, Late Gothic Revival, and Classical Revival style architecture.  Notable buildings include the City Hall and Superior Courthouse (1927), the second Gary Land Company Building (c. 1907), Olympic Hotel (c. 1928), the "Modern Apartments" (c. 1929), Dalton Apartments (c. 1929), Gary State Bank Building (1929), Hotel Gary (1926), City Methodist Church (1926), YWCA Building (1922), and former U.S. Post Office Building (1936).

It was listed in the National Register of Historic Places in 1994.

References

Historic districts on the National Register of Historic Places in Indiana
Gothic Revival architecture in Indiana
Tudor Revival architecture in Indiana
Neoclassical architecture in Indiana
Historic districts in Gary, Indiana
National Register of Historic Places in Gary, Indiana